Colleen Pearce (born 20 December 1961) is an Australian field hockey player. She competed in the women's tournament at the 1984 Summer Olympics. She is the daughter of the 1964 Bronze and 1968 Silver medal winning Olympian Eric Pearce.

References

External links
 

1961 births
Living people
Australian female field hockey players
Olympic field hockey players of Australia
Field hockey players at the 1984 Summer Olympics
Australian people of Anglo-Indian descent
Australian sportspeople of Indian descent
Place of birth missing (living people)